Water for injection is water of extra high quality without significant contamination. A sterile version is used for making solutions that will be given by injection. Before such use other substances generally must be added to make the solution more or less isotonic. It can be given by injection into a vein, muscle, or under the skin. A non-sterile version may be used in manufacturing with sterilization occurring later in the production process.

If it is given by injection into a vein without making it approximately isotonic, breakdown of red blood cells may occur. This can then result in kidney problems. Excessive amount may also result in fluid overload. Water for injection is generally made by distillation or reverse osmosis. It should contain less than a mg of elements other than water per 100 ml. Versions with agents that stop bacterial growth are also available.

It is on the World Health Organization's List of Essential Medicines. Water for injection is available over the counter in the United States.

Other names

References

External links
  Inspection Technical Guides Water for Pharmaceutical Use
Guideline on the quality of water for pharmaceutical use (EMA, European Medicines Agency)
 

Intravenous fluids
Water
Wikipedia medicine articles ready to translate
World Health Organization essential medicines